Upper Cascades is a waterfall in North Central North Carolina, located in Hanging Rock State Park, in Stokes County.

Geology
The waterway is Cascades Creek, which flows through Hanging Rock State Park.  The falls flow over a steep cascade before continuing down Cascades Creek to Lower Cascades.

Visiting the Falls
The falls are open to the public and are accessible from the visitor center at Hanging Rock State Park.  Visitors may take a 0.3-mile (.5 km) trail to the falls.  There is a wooden observation deck with a view of the falls, as well as wooden steps which lead to the base of the falls.

Nearby Falls
Hanging Rock State Park hosts 4 other waterfalls:

Tory's Falls
Lower Cascades
Window Falls
Hidden Falls

References

External links
North Carolina Waterfalls - Lower and Upper Cascades
Photos of Upper Cascades and Hidden Falls

Protected areas of Stokes County, North Carolina
Waterfalls of North Carolina
Waterfalls of Stokes County, North Carolina